A rate sensor is a sensor that measures a rate (or rate of change). It may refer to:
 Angular rate sensor
 Rate gyro
 Yaw-rate sensor
 Heart rate sensor
 Breath rate sensor
 Oxygen transmission rate sensors
 Moisture vapor transmission rate sensors

See also 
 Sensor based Variable Rate Application

Sensors